Marie Pleyel (born Marie-Félicité-Denise Moke; 4 July or 4 September 1811  – 30 March 1875) was a Belgian concert pianist.

Early life
With a father from Torhout in Flemish-speaking Belgium who was a language teacher, and a German mother who ran a lingerie shop in the 9th arrondissement, Pleyel was born in Paris and was trilingual. She studied the piano with Henri Herz, Moscheles, and Kalkbrenner. She gave her first formal recital at the age of eight, amazing the public with her young virtuosity. 

The famous critic François Joseph Fétis wrote that he had heard all the famous pianists, but that none conveyed to him a sentiment of perfection like Madame Pleyel ("...mais je déclare qu'aucun d'eux ne m'a donné, comme Madame Pleyel, le sentiment de perfection.").

Marriage and later career
Berlioz was desperately in love with Pleyel, and in 1830 they became engaged. While he was in Italy, she broke off the engagement to marry Camille Pleyel, son of Ignaz Pleyel, and heir to the piano manufacturing business.

Pleyel was one of the most admired pianists of the 1830s. In 1848, she became chair of the piano department of the Brussels Conservatoire.

She died in Saint-Josse-ten-Noode, near Brussels.

References

1811 births
1875 deaths
19th-century Belgian women musicians
Belgian classical pianists
Belgian women musicians
Burials at Laeken Cemetery
Musicians from Paris
Academic staff of the Royal Conservatory of Brussels
Women music educators
19th-century women pianists